Little Ephraim Robin John and Ancona Robin Robin John were two 18th century African slave traders, later slaves, and finally free men who were members of the ruling family of Old Town, Calabur, Nigeria. Ancona was either a son or nephew of Little Ephraim.  

Members of the Efik clan, the men were seen as valuable assets because they spoke multiple languages (including English), were literate, could negotiate, and had a strong knowledge of the slave trade. 

The Robin Johns were captured while participating in a slave trade expedition. They were sold to British slave traders while the king of Old Town, Grandy King George was negotiating trade with the Duke of New Town. 

The Robin Johns were deceived twice by captains promising to bring them home to Africa. While in the United Kingdom the two men successfully petitioned the British courts for their freedom.

Early life and capture  
By the mid-1700s a bitter rivalry had formed between Old Town and New Town in Old Calabar. In 1767 trade negotiations between Grandy King George and Duke Ephraim of New Town turned bitter, which stalled the local slave trade. New Town's African slave traders then recruited the help of British slave traders to successfully launch an ambush on those involved in the slave trade in Old Town. 

Both  Robin Johns were captured during the ambush and sold into slavery.

Captivity

Dominica 
The Robin Johns were transported to Dominica by Captain Bivins on the Duke of York.  Once on the island, the men were sold to a French physician

Several months later, Captain William Sharp of Liverpool convinced the Robin Johns that he would transport them back to Africa if they were able to escape to his ship. In a letter, one of men stated that he was "determined to get home". One night, the Robin Johns slipped away and boarded Sharp's ship.

Instead of sailing to Africa, Sharp sailed to Virginia, where he sold the Robin Johns to John Thompson.

Virginia 
Their new owner, John Thompson of Williamsburg, Virginia was a slave trader,  He frequently took the men with him on his voyages.  A short tempered man, Thompson beat the Robin Johns frequently. In March 1772, Thompson died. 

Shortly after Thompson's death, the Robin Johns encountered some sailors from Old Town who were in port in Virginia on the slave trading ship Greyhound.  The sailors recognized the two men and remember the story of their ambush in Africa. They relayed the story to their captain, Captain Terence O'Neil, urging him to help the Robin Johns.  O'Neil said that he would ultimately transport the men to Africa if they escaped their bondage. 

The Robin Johns escaped to the Greyhound, which then sailed to Bristol, England.

Liverpool 
Upon arriving in Liverpool O'Neil transferred the Robin Johns to another ship that was headed back to Virginia, with plans to sell them again. The Robin Johns spent two weeks locked in a slave ship before they sent a letter to the prominent slave trader Thomas Jones, who knew the Robin Johns personally, as he had made many trips to Old Calabar in the 1760s. Jones had formed close relationships with the ruling family of Old Town. Immediately after the ambush Grandy King George had written to Thomas Jones, asking for his help with bringing his brother and nephew home.

Court case in England 
Through Thomas Jones, the Robin Johns petitioned for their freedom. Jones used the 1772 ruling on the James Somersett case, attempting to use Habeas Corpus to free the Robin Johns. A judge ruled that the Robin Johns were free and could not be returned to America to be sold again. After being declared free, the two men traveled back to Calabur.

Later life and legacy 
While in Bristol the Robin Johns interacted with Charles and John Wesley, and converted to Methodism. Oral tradition relates that they were responsible for the spread of Christianity in Calabar after their return in 1794. 

Some evidence suggests that Ephraim engaged in the slave trade after returning to Calabur; he had previously suggested to Charles Wesley that he saw little alternative if he was to repay Thomas Jones for his help.

The Robin Johns' association with John Wesley is thought to have influenced his attack on the institution of slavery in his pamphlet Thoughts upon Slavery (1774).

See also
List of kidnappings
List of solved missing person cases

References 

1760s missing person cases
18th-century American slaves
18th-century Nigerian people
African slave traders
American freedmen
Duos
Formerly missing people
Kidnapped Nigerian people
Missing person cases in Africa
Nigerian slaves
People from Calabar